Baladitya may refer to:

 Baladitya (actor) (active from 1991), Telugu actor
 Narasimhagupta, a 5th-century emperor of the Gupta dynasty
 Dhruvasena II, a 7th-century ruler of the Maitraka dynasty